Mahra is a town and union council in Dera Ismail Khan District of Khyber-Pakhtunkhwa. It is located at 31°30'0N 70°45'0E and has an altitude of 154 metres (508 feet).

References

Union councils of Dera Ismail Khan District
Populated places in Dera Ismail Khan District